At the 1996 Summer Olympics in Atlanta, the team event in women's synchronized swimming was contested. It was the first appearance of the team event, which replaced the duet and solo events held previously. (The duet event would return four years later.)

Eight countries qualified for the Olympic Games at an Olympic qualifying event held in conjunction with the 1995 FINA Synchronized Swimming World Cup. Each team consisted of eight swimmers (chosen from a total team of ten). The competition included two events, the technical routine program and the free routine program.

The technical routine required entries to perform a series of required elements in prescribed order. It had a time limit of two minutes and 50 seconds. Music selection and choreography was up to the discretion of each team. In the free routine, there were no specifications for the routine other than the five-minute time limit. In both the technical and free routines, a panel of 10 judges (five giving scores for technical merit and five awarding scores for artistic impression) awarded points from 0 to 10 in one tenth point increments.

When the technical merit and artistic impression scores were calculated for a total score, the technical routine score was weighted to 35 percent and the free routine to 65 percent. These two scores were then combined to determine overall medal placement.

Schedule

Results

References

External links
Official Olympic Report

 
1996 Summer Olympics events
1996
1996 in synchronized swimming
Synchronized swimming competitions in the United States
International aquatics competitions hosted by the United States